Hemibagrus imbrifer is a species of bagrid catfish found in the Salween river drainage.

References

Ng, H.H. and C.J. Ferraris Jr., 2000. A review of the genus Hemibagrus in Southern Asia, with descriptions of two new species. Proc. Cal. Acad. Sci. 52(11):125-142.

Bagridae
Fish of Asia
Fish of Malaysia
Taxa named by Heok Hee Ng
Taxa named by Carl J. Ferraris Jr.
Fish described in 2000